Spook: Science Tackles the Afterlife (2005), published by W. W. Norton & Company, a nonfiction work by Mary Roach, is a humorous scientific exploration as to whether there is a soul that survives death. In Britain, the title of the book is Six Feet Over: Adventures in the Afterlife.

Spook: Science Tackles the Afterlife was the recipient of the Elle Reader's Prize in October 2005. Spook was also listed as a New York Times Notable Books pick in 2005, as well as a New York Times Bestseller, and it was also an October Booksense pick.

Book synopsis

Author Mary Roach investigates the possibility of an afterlife and also attempts to find and define the soul, all while using a scientific approach. 
The book covers these topics:
Investigations of reincarnation
Attempts to find the soul (by dissection, weighing, and other methods)
Spiritualism, fraudulent mediums, and ectoplasm
Modern mediumship, and "medium schools"
Attempts to use electronic devices to communicate with the dead, including electronic voice phenomena (EVP)
Other forces that make people feel haunted electromagnetic fields, infrasound, etc.
Court cases involving ghosts
Near-death experiences and out-of-body experiences

References

External links 
 Mary Roach's website
 Roach talks about Spook with Stephen Colbert on the Colbert Report

2005 non-fiction books
Religious studies books
Books about death
Afterlife
W. W. Norton & Company books